is the 40th studio album by Japanese singer-songwriter Miyuki Nakajima, released in 2014.

Track listing
All songs written and composed by Miyuki Nakajima and arranged by Ichizo Seo.
"" – 5:27
"" – 5:08
"" – 4:13
""" – 4:56
"" – 6:26
"" – 4:09
"" – 5:40
"" – 4:43
"" – 5:17
"India Goose" – 6:17

Personnel
Miyuki Nakajima – Lead vocals

References

Miyuki Nakajima albums
2014 albums